The Order of the Somali Star is the highest distinction award for military gallantry in Somalia. The Order of the Somali Star has been awarded to members of the Somali Armed Forces and foreign citizens who have conducted and exhibited great fidelity to the Somali Republic. It has been issued mainly during the Ogaden War to military and police officers posthumously.

History 
The Order of the Somali Star was established by the Government of Somalia and was named in honour of the Somali flag, a sky blue field emblazoned with a white singular central star, the award was established the year after that Somalia became a republic in 1961 by the founding father and first President of Somalia, Aden Adde. The award can be worn as a necklet, medal or a sash.

Statute 
The title of Order of the Somali Star can be awarded for military gallantry in the service of Somalia. It can be awarded to both civilian and military personnel. The title can also be awarded posthumously if the heroic act costs the recipient his or her life. It may also be awarded to foreign citizens who display exceptional service to the Somali republic, The President of Somalia is the main conferring authority of the award although the Federal Parliament may nominate individuals for the President's consideration.

Description 
The award comes in grades with the Order of the Leopard (formerly the Knight of the Grand Cross changed due to the adoption of Islam as the state religion) which gold-plated badge to be worn on the band and gold-plated plate to be worn on the left chest; Grand Officer, silver badge to be worn on a ribbon around the neck and plaque to be worn on the left chest; Commander, silver badge to be worn on a ribbon around the neck; Officer, silver badge to be worn on a ribbon with a rosette on the chest; Knight, silver badge to be worn on a ribbon on the chest.

Recipients 
The vast majority of recipients of this award are Somali military officers and enlisted soldiers who died in service to Somalia, however there are foreign dignitaries who received this award due to their exceptional service to the Somali state.

Individuals

Military personnel 

 Major General Daud Abdulle Hirsi (Army)
 Major General Mohamed Siad Barre (Army)
 Major General Dahir Adan Elmi (Army)
 Lieutenant General Mohamed Ali Samatar (Army)
 Brigadier General Ali Matan Xashi (Air Force)
 Vice Admiral Mohamed Osman (Navy)
 Colonel Abukar Liban (Army)

Foreign dignitaries 

  Fidel Castro - Awarded in 1977, for "extraordinary services to Somalia."
  Faisal I - Awarded in light of the brotherly bond between Somalia and Saudi Arabia during his reign.
  Anwar Sadat - Provided unconditional support for Somalia during the Ogaden War, also Egypt and Somalia were regular participants of Bright Star war games, Somalia also was one of the few countries to send dignitaries to attend Sadat's state funeral in 1981.
  Muammar Gaddafi - Libya and Somalia had very warm relations under the tenure of Chairman Gaddafi, as both countries were Italophonic, members of the Arab League and OIC and had pan-African viewpoints.
  Haile Selassie I - Awarded the Grand Cordon in 1960, as the first non-Somali recipient by President Aden Adde due to the fraternal relations between Imperial Ethiopia and Somalia.
  Jaafar Nimeiry - Sudan and Somalia had very warm relations under the tenure of President Nimeiry, also Nimeiry was a vocal advocate of Barre's chairmanship of the OAU in 1974.
  Recep Tayyip Erdoğan - Awarded in 2015 for his contributions to Somalia.
  Josip Broz Tito - Awarded in 1976, Somalia and Yugoslavia had a strategic and warm relationship as both were non-Soviet aligned countries yet were both socialist, Somalia also sent dignitaries to Tito's funeral in 1980, this carries forwards onto the modern Serbia–Somalia relations.

See also 

 Order of the Nile
 Hero of the Soviet Union
 Nishan-e-Haider
 Gold Medal of Military Valour

References 

Orders, decorations, and medals of Somalia
Military history of Somalia
History of Somalia
Somalia-related lists